The 1915 All-Ireland Senior Hurling Championship was the 29th staging of the All-Ireland hurling championship since its establishment by the Gaelic Athletic Association in 1887. The championship began on 25 April 1915 and ended on 24 October 1915.

Clare were the defending champions, however, they were defeated in the provincial series. Laois won the championship after defeating Cork by 6-2 to 4-1 in the final.

Teams

A total of seventeen teams contested the championship.

Results

Leinster Senior Hurling Championship

Munster Senior Hurling Championship

Ulster Senior Hurling Championship

All-Ireland Senior Hurling Championship

Championship statistics

Miscellaneous

 The Munster semi-final between Cork and Limerick was abandoned with four minutes left in the match. Lloyd's News reported that "betting" was the cause of a dispute.
 Monaghan retain the Ulster title for the only time in their history. It remains their last provincial triumph.
 Due to a delay in the southern province, Clare represented Munster in the All-Ireland semi-final and defeated Galway to qualify for the All-Ireland final. Cork subsequently defeated Clare in the Munster final and claimed their place in the All-Ireland decider.
 The All-Ireland final between Cork and Laois was the first championship meeting between the two sides. Their second championship meeting did not take place until 2011 when Cork were victorious. As a result of this, Laois were the only team that Cork had played but never beaten in the championship.
 Laois become the 10th team to win the All-Ireland crown. It remains their only championship title.

References

Sources

 Corry, Eoghan, The GAA Book of Lists (Hodder Headline Ireland, 2005).
 Donegan, Des, The Complete Handbook of Gaelic Games (DBA Publications Limited, 2005).

1915